Dunnington for Kexby railway station served the village of Dunnington, North Yorkshire, England from 1913 to 1981 by the Derwent Valley Light Railway.

History 
The station opened on 21 July 1913 by the Derwent Valley Light Railway. It closed to passengers on 1 September 1926 and to freight, along with the line as a whole, in 1981.

References

External links 

Disused railway stations in North Yorkshire
Railway stations in Great Britain opened in 1913
Railway stations in Great Britain closed in 1926
1913 establishments in England
1926 disestablishments in England